Pine Island may refer to:
Pine Island, Calhoun County, Florida, an unincorporated community near Blountstown
Pine Island, Hernando County, Florida, a census-designated place near Spring Hill
Pine Island (Lee County, Florida), an island near Cape Coral
Pine Island Center, Florida, a census-designated place on that island
Pine Island National Wildlife Refuge on that island
Pine Island Sound west of that island
Pine Island Ridge, Florida, a former census-designated place, now part of Davie, Broward County